The Üür River is a river in the Khövsgöl aimag of northern Mongolia.
It starts in about 30 km from the Russian border in Tsagaan-Üür sum, from the confluence of the Old Üür and the Young Üür.
The river is a tributary of the Egiin Gol, which it meets in the Erdenebulgan sum.

See also
List of rivers of Mongolia

References

www.medeelel.mn (in Mongolian)

Rivers of Mongolia
Khövsgöl Province